HD 180902 is a binary star approximately 342 light years away in the constellation  Sagittarius. The primary is a K-type star while the nature of the secondary is unknown since it has only been detected by its effect on the radial velocity of the primary.

It has one confirmed planet, HD 180902 b, and one candidate planet.

Planetary system
HD 180902 b was discovered using the Doppler spectroscopy method with observations taken at the W. M. Keck Observatory. The radial velocities showed there a long term linear trend in the data indicating an additional companion of unknown nature with a longer period. This was later shown due to a stellar binary companion.

There is second unconfirmed planet with a mass twice that of Neptune and an orbital period of 15 days.

References

Durchmusterung objects
180902
094951
Planetary systems with one confirmed planet
K-type giants
Sagittarius (constellation)